Chahar Suq And Hajj Muhammad Husayn Mosque in Ardakan, the center of the city, is located opposite the Ardakan Seminary.

References

Mosques in Iran
Mosque buildings with domes
National works of Iran